Malpeque is a federal electoral district in Prince Edward Island, Canada, that has been represented in the House of Commons of Canada since 1968. Its population in 2011 was 35,039.

Demographics
 Ethnic groups: 98.8% White
 Languages: 95.7% English, 2.5% French, 1.4% Other
 Religions: 53.2% Protestant, 36.4% Catholic, 2.9% Other Christian, 7.3% no affiliation
 Average income: $24,005

According to the Canada 2016 Census
 Most common mother tongue languages (2016) :  95.5% English, 2.0% French, 0.6% Dutch, 0.3% German, 0.3% Mandarin, 0.2% Spanish, 0.2% Tagalog

Geography
The district includes the extreme eastern part of Prince County and most of Queens County except the extreme eastern portion and the City of Charlottetown.  Communities include Cornwall, Kensington, Miltonvale Park, Borden-Carleton, North Rustico and Clyde River. The area is 1,663 km2.

History
The electoral district was created in 1966 from parts of Prince and Queen's ridings. There will be no boundary changes as a result of the 2012 federal electoral redistribution.

Members of parliament

This riding has elected the following members of parliament:

Election results

2021 general election

2019 general election

2015 general election

2011 general election

2008 general election

2006 general election

2004 general election

2000 general election

1997 general election

1993 general election

1988 general election

1984 general election

1980 general election

1979 general election

1977 by-election

1974 general election

1972 general election

1968 general election

Student Vote results

2011 election
In 2011, a Student Vote was conducted at participating Canadian schools to parallel the 2011 Canadian federal election results. The vote was designed to educate students and simulate the electoral process for persons who have not yet reached the legal majority. Schools with a large student body that reside in another electoral district had the option to vote for candidates outside of the electoral district then where they were physically located.

See also
 List of Canadian federal electoral districts
 Past Canadian electoral districts

References

Notes

External links
 

Prince Edward Island federal electoral districts